Justin Lewis (born April 12, 2002) is an American professional basketball player player for the Chicago Bulls of the National Basketball Association (NBA), on a two-way contract with the Windy City Bulls of the NBA G League. He played college basketball for the Marquette Golden Eagles.

Early life and high school career
Lewis was born and grew up in Baltimore, Maryland and initially attended Calvert Hall College High School. He transferred to the Baltimore Polytechnic Institute after his freshman year. As a junior, Lewis averaged 17.3 points and 9.2 rebounds per game with 16 double doubles and was named first team All-Metro and second team All-Maryland by USA Today as Baltimore Polytechnic won the state championship. As a senior, he averaged 19.3 points, 13.4 rebounds and 4.4 blocks per game and was named the Metro co-Player of the Year and first team All-Maryland while leading the team to a second straight state championship. A four-star recruit, he committed to playing college basketball for Marquette over offers from UConn and Virginia Tech, among others.

College career
Lewis came off the bench for Marquette as a freshman. He averaged 7.8 points and 5.4 rebounds per game. On January 26, 2022, Lewis scored a career-high 33 points as well as nine rebounds and six assists in a 73–63 win against Seton Hall. He was named to the First Team All-Big East, as well as Big East Most Improved Player.

Professional career

Chicago / Windy City Bulls (2023–present) 
After becoming undrafted in the 2022 NBA draft, Lewis signed a two-way contract with the Chicago Bulls of the National Basketball Association. Lewis joined the Bulls in the 2022 NBA Summer League. In his Summer League debut, Lewis scored eight points and five rebounds in a 100–99 win against the Dallas Mavericks. He signed a two-way contract with the Chicago Bulls on March 7, 2023.

Career statistics

College

|-
| style="text-align:left;"| 2020–21
| style="text-align:left;"| Marquette
| 21 || 1 || 21.0 || .417 || .219 || .577 || 5.4 || .8 || .4 || .7 || 7.8
|-
| style="text-align:left;"| 2021–22
| style="text-align:left;"| Marquette
| 32 || 32 || 32.2 || .440 || .345 || .761 || 7.9 || 1.7 || 1.1 || .6 || 16.8

References

External links
Marquette Golden Eagles bio
USA Basketball bio

2002 births
Living people
American men's basketball players
Baltimore Polytechnic Institute alumni
Basketball players from Baltimore
Marquette Golden Eagles men's basketball players
Power forwards (basketball)